WAUE (100.3 FM, "AU100") is a radio station licensed to serve the community of Waverly, Alabama. The station is owned by Marble City Media, LLC and airs an adult contemporary music format.

The station was assigned the call sign WAUA by the Federal Communications Commission on November 2, 2015. The station changed its call sign to WAUE on March 24, 2019.

On November 13, 2019, WAUE changed their format from country to adult contemporary, branded as "AU100".

References

External links
Official Website

AUE
Radio stations established in 2018
2018 establishments in Alabama
Mainstream adult contemporary radio stations in the United States
Chambers County, Alabama
Lee County, Alabama